Bryan Swanson (born 1980 in Edinburgh, Scotland) is a former Chief News Reporter at Sky Sports News.

Biography 

Swanson was educated at George Heriot's School in Edinburgh. He left aged 17 for a job on Edinburgh's outpost of L!VE TV as a sports reporter and presenter. The following year, he joined Manchester United Television (MUTV) as a reporter. 

In August 1999, he moved to Newcastle upon Tyne, and became the youngest ever sports reporter/presenter on the major regional ITV station Tyne Tees. He received a Commendation in a regional division of the Royal Television Society (North East & Border) as a Promising Newcomer. In 2003 he joined Sky Sports News as North East Correspondent in Newcastle but relocated to London in March 2004.  Foreign assignments included reporting on the 2006 FIFA World Cup in Germany. 

In September 2008, Swanson became the new Chief News Reporter for Sky Sports News, replacing Dan Roan who moved to rival Setanta Sports.

In 2015, Swanson was seconded to Head of Internal Communications at Sky, before returning to Sky Sports News HQ 11 months later in August 2016. 

In July 2021, Swanson announced that he would be leaving Sky Sports News after 18 years on the channel. He tweeted, "Today is my final day at Sky Studios, before leaving the company next week, rounding off an incredible 18-year journey," and confirmed that he was joining FIFA as Director of Media Relations.

In November 2022, he came out as gay.

References 

1980 births
Living people
Television personalities from Edinburgh
People educated at George Heriot's School
Scottish gay men